"Wait for U" is a song by American rapper Future featuring Canadian rapper and singer Drake and Nigerian singer Tems. It was sent to rhythmic contemporary radio as the second single from Future's ninth studio album, I Never Liked You, on May 3, 2022. The song samples Tems' song, "Higher", from her debut extended play, For Broken Ears (2020). Future and Drake wrote the song with producers FnZ (Finatik and Zac) and ATL Jacob, alongside Tejiri Akpoghene and Tems, who are credited songwriters for the sampling of "Higher", and Floyd E. Bentley III.  "Wait for U" is an R&B song that lyrically discusses the occasional toxicity of a romantic relationship. The song debuted at number one on the US Billboard Hot 100, becoming Future's second (first as a lead artist), Drake's tenth, and Tems' first number-one hit on the Hot 100.

Critical reception
Michael Di Gennaro of Exclaim! felt that "Wait for U" is one of "the most Drake-sounding Future songs from a production standpoint" with "tender moments that harken back to the popstar aspirations Future once had when writing songs for Rihanna and Ciara". In a negative review, HipHopDX music critic Anthony Malone opined that both "Wait for U" and "I'm on One", another track from I Never Liked You that Drake is featured on, do not "match the toxic king chemistry of their previous collaborations", adding that "like an old rock star who can still play the hits off muscle memory, Drake and Future recite the same stories of one-night stands, DM debauchery and drug-filled nights at the club in their sleep" and "however, their charisma is notably absent from the music. In a similar review, Alphonse Pierre of Pitchfork said that the sample of "Higher" by Tems "is a cheat code to a catchy song, but Future and Drake are on such autopilot that I'd rather listen to the original".

Music video

The official music video for "Wait for U", directed by Director X, was released on May 5, 2022. It is a medieval-themed video that deals with love and betrayal. The video includes cameo appearances from Moxie Raia, Cece Rose, producer ATL Jacob, Strick, and Trey Richards. Drake plays a knight that delivers a note to a queen for Future, who plays a "toxic" king. On the way to deliver the note, Drake engages in a sword fight and saves a woman. At the end of the video, Future wins a duel against another man as the queen reads his note, rolls her eyes and throws it away. Future's note is a reference to a leaked text exchange of his from 2018 in which he told a woman he did not want to see her. The music video was filmed at Casa Loma in Toronto, Canada.

Credits and personnel
 Future – lead vocals, songwriting
 Drake – featured vocals, songwriting
 Tems – featured vocals, songwriting
 FnZ
 Finatik – production, songwriting
 Zac – production, songwriting
 ATL Jacob – production, songwriting
 Wheezy - production, songwriting
 Sonic Major - production, songwriting
 Tejiri Akpoghene - songwriting 
 Floyd E. Bentley III - songwriting
 Ethan Stevens – mixing
 Joe LaPorta – mastering
 Eric Manco – recording

Charts

Weekly charts

Year-end charts

Certifications

Release history

References

2022 singles
2022 songs
Future (rapper) songs
Songs written by Future (rapper)
Drake (musician) songs
Songs written by Drake (musician)
Tems (singer) songs
Songs written by Tems (singer)
Billboard Hot 100 number-one singles
Epic Records singles
Music videos directed by Director X
Songs written by ATL Jacob